George Robson may refer to:

George Robson (racing driver) (1909–1946), Canadian racing driver
George Robson (rugby union) (born 1985), English rugby union player
George Fennell Robson (1788–1833), English painter
George Robson (footballer, born 1905) (1905–1982), English footballer
George Robson (footballer, born 1897) (1897–1984), English footballer